WGBF-FM (103.1 MHz) is a radio station broadcasting a mainstream rock format. Licensed to Henderson, Kentucky, United States, the station serves the Evansville area. The station is currently owned by Townsquare Media and features programming from Compass Media Networks. The station is also broadcast on HD radio. Monday through Saturday morning, WGBF airs the nationally syndicated The Free Beer and Hot Wings Show.

History
WGBF-FM first signed on in December 1971. In 1979, the station's call letters were changed to WHKC, and it was referred to on-air as "KC103". By 1984, WHKC broadcast a contemporary hit radio format.

The station returned to the WGBF-FM call letters in 1986 and switched to a rock format, which it still broadcasts today.

Under the ownership of the late Larry Aiken from 1987 to 1996, WGBF-FM was one of the first stations to broadcast the Bob & Tom Show outside of Indianapolis.

References

External links

GBF-FM
Mainstream rock radio stations in the United States
Townsquare Media radio stations
Henderson, Kentucky
1971 establishments in Kentucky
Radio stations established in 1971